Mount Xiuguluan (Bunun: Halinpudu) is a mountain in Taiwan in Yushan National Park with an elevation of 3,825 m. It is located in Hualien County by the Xiuguluan River which has many tributaries such as Fuyuan River, Fengping River, and Lekuleku River, all nearby the river basin. It is the tallest mountain in the Central Mountain Range and the 6th tallest in Taiwan.

See also
100 Peaks of Taiwan
List of mountains in Taiwan
List of rivers in Taiwan

References

External links
Yushan mountain  ranges

Landforms of Hualien County
Xiuguluan